Burke Boyce (June 19, 1901 – December 15, 1969) was an American fencer. He competed in the individual and team foil events at the 1924 Summer Olympics.  He graduated from Harvard University.

References

External links
 

1901 births
1969 deaths
American male foil fencers
Olympic fencers of the United States
Fencers at the 1924 Summer Olympics
Sportspeople from St. Louis
Harvard Crimson fencers